Grady Tate (January 14, 1932 – October 8, 2017) was an American jazz and soul-jazz drummer and baritone vocalist. In addition to his work as sideman, Tate released many albums as leader and lent his voice to songs in the animated Schoolhouse Rock! series.

Biography
Tate was born in Hayti, Durham, North Carolina, United States. In 1963 he moved to New York City, where he became the drummer in Quincy Jones's band.

Grady Tate's drumming helped to define a particular hard bop, soul jazz and organ trio sound during the mid-1960s and beyond. His slick, layered and intense sound is instantly recognizable for its understated style in which he integrates his trademark subtle nuances with sharp, crisp "on top of the beat" timing (in comparison to playing slightly before, or slightly after the beat).
The Grady Tate sound can be heard prominently on many of the classic Jimmy Smith and Wes Montgomery albums recorded on the Verve label in the 1960s.

During the 1970s he was a member of the New York Jazz Quartet. In 1981 he played drums and percussion for Simon and Garfunkel's Concert in Central Park.

As a sideman he has played with musicians including Jimmy Smith, Astrud Gilberto, Ella Fitzgerald, Duke Ellington, Count Basie, Rahsaan Roland Kirk, Quincy Jones, Stan Getz, Cal Tjader, Wes Montgomery, Eddie Harris, J.J. Johnson, Kai Winding and Michel Legrand.

Among his most widely heard vocal performances are the songs "I Got Six", "Naughty Number Nine", and "Fireworks" from Multiplication Rock and America Rock, both part of the Schoolhouse Rock series. For the 1973 motion picture Cops And Robbers, Tate sang the title song, written by Michel Legrand and Jacques Wilson. On Mark Murphy's album Living Room, Tate shares the vocals on a medley of "Misty" and "Midnight Sun". On the album "Threesome" with Monty Alexander and Niels-Henning Ørsted Pedersen he sings words to Miles Davis's composition All Blues aggregated from a number of well-known and standard blues songs as well as to the jazz standard "Weaver of Dreams" (written by Victor Young).

He joined the faculty of Howard University in 1989.

Grady Tate died of complications of Alzheimer's disease on October 8, 2017 at the age of 85. He was survived by his wife Vivian and son Grady, Jr.

Discography

As leader
 Windmills of My Mind (Skye, 1968) 
 Slaves [O.S.T.] (Skye, 1969)
 Feeling Life (Skye, 1969)
 After the Long Drive Home (Skye, 1970)
 She Is My Lady (Janus, 1972)
 Movin' Day (Janus, 1974)
 By Special Request (Buddah, 1974) compilation
 Master Grady Tate (ABC Impulse, 1977)
 Sings TNT (Milestone, 1991)
 Body & Soul (Milestone, 1993)
 Feeling Free (Pow Wow, 1999)
 All Love (Eighty-Eight's, 2002)
 From the Heart: Songs Sung Live at the Blue Note (Half Note, 2006)

As sideman
With Benny Bailey
The Satchmo Legacy (Enja, 2000)

With Ray Bryant
Up Above the Rock (Cadet, 1968)
Here's Ray Bryant (Pablo, 1976)
All Blues (Pablo, 1978)

With Kenny Burrell
 1965 Guitar Forms (Verve)
 1967 A Generation Ago Today (Verve)
 1968 Blues – The Common Ground (Verve)

With Johnny Hodges
 1965 Joe's Blues (Verve) with Wild Bill Davis
 1966 Blue Notes (Verve)
 1967 Don't Sleep in the Subway (Verve)
 1970 3 Shades of Blue (Flying Dutchman)

With J. J. Johnson
 1964 J.J.! (RCA Victor)
 1965 Broadway Express (RCA Victor)
 1966 The Total J.J. Johnson (RCA Victor)
 1968 Israel (A&M/CTI)
 1969 Stonebone (A&M/CTI [Japan])

With Quincy Jones
 1964 Golden Boy (Mercury)
 1969 Walking in Space (A&M/CTI)
 1970 Gula Matari (A&M/CTI)
 1971 Smackwater Jack (A&M/CTI)
 1972 The Hot Rock OST (Prophesy)
 1973 You've Got It Bad Girl (A&M)

With Oliver Nelson
 1964 More Blues and the Abstract Truth (Impulse!)
 1966 Encyclopedia of Jazz (Verve)
 1966 Happenings (Impulse!)
 1966 Oliver Nelson Plays Michelle (Impulse!)
 1966 Sound Pieces (Impulse!)
 1966 The Sound of Feeling (Verve)
 1967 The Kennedy Dream (Impulse!)
 1967 The Spirit of '67 (Impulse!)

With Houston Person
 1972 Broken Windows, Empty Hallways (Prestige)
 1972 Sweet Buns & Barbeque (Prestige)
 1976 The Big Horn (Muse)
 1977 The Nearness of You (Muse)
 1987 The Talk of the Town (Muse)
 1990 Just Friends (Muse, [rel. 1992]) with Buddy Tate, Nat Simpkins
 1994 Christmas with Houston Person and Friends (Muse)
 1999 Soft Lights (HighNote)
 2001 Blue Velvet (HighNote)
 2002 Sentimental Journey (HighNote)
With Jimmy Rushing 
Every Day I Have the Blues (BluesWay, 1967)
With Lalo Schifrin
 1964 New Fantasy (Verve)
 1965 Once a Thief and Other Themes (Verve)
 1992 Jazz Meets the Symphony (Atlantic)
 1993 More Jazz Meets the Symphony (Atlantic)
 1995 Firebird: Jazz Meets the Symphony No. 3 (Four Winds)
With Zoot Sims
Zoot Sims and the Gershwin Brothers (Pablo, 1975)
Soprano Sax (Pablo, 1976)
With Jimmy Smith
 1964 The Cat (Verve)
 1965 Monster (Verve)
 1965 Organ Grinder Swing (Verve)
 1966 Got My Mojo Workin' (Verve)
 1966 Hoochie Coochie Man (Verve)
 1986 Go for Whatcha Know (Blue Note)
 1990 Fourmost (Recorded Live at Fat Tuesday's NYC) (Milestone)
 2001 Fourmost Return (Milestone)

With Billy Taylor
 1968 I Wish I Knew How It Would Feel to Be Free (Tower)
 1969 Sleeping Bee (MPS)
 1977 Live at Storyville (West 54)

With Cal Tjader
 1964 Soul Sauce (Verve)
 1965 Soul Bird: Whiffenpoof (Verve)
 1966 Soul Burst (Verve)
 1967 Along Comes Cal (Verve)
 1968 Solar Heat (Skye)

With others
 1962 Charles Mingus, The Complete Town Hall Concert (Blue Note)
 1963 Gary McFarland, The In Sound (Verve)
 1964 Ben Webster, See You at the Fair (Impulse!)
 1964 Budd Johnson, Off the Wall (Argo)
 1964 Lou Donaldson, Rough House Blues (Argo)
 1964 Nat Adderley, Autobiography (Atlantic)
 1965 Dave Pike, Jazz for the Jet Set (Atlantic)
 1965 Dorothy Ashby, The Fantastic Jazz Harp of Dorothy Ashby (Atlantic)
 1965 Gary McFarland & Clark Terry, Tijuana Jazz (Impulse!)
 1965 Illinois Jacquet, Spectrum (Argo)
 1965 Kai Winding, Rainy Day (Verve)
 1965 Milt Jackson, Ray Brown / Milt Jackson (Verve)
 1965 Roland Kirk & Al Hibbler, A Meeting of the Times (Atlantic)
 1965 Stanley Turrentine, Joyride (Blue Note)
 1966 Bill Evans, Bill Evans Trio with Symphony Orchestra (Verve)
 1966 Clark Terry, Mumbles (Mainstream)
 1966 Eric Kloss, Love and All That Jazz (Prestige)
 1966 Gabor Szabo, Gypsy '66 (Impulse!)
 1966 Jimmy McGriff, The Big Band (Solid State)
 1966 Kai Winding, More Brass, Dirty Dog (Verve)
 1966 Shirley Scott, Roll 'Em: Shirley Scott Plays the Big Bands (Impulse!)
 1967 Herbie Mann, Glory of Love (A&M/CTI)
 1967 Kai Winding, Penny Lane & Time (Verve)
 1967 Stan Getz, Sweet Rain (Verve)
 1967 Jerome Richardson, Groove Merchant (Verve)
 1968 Peggy Lee, 2 Shows Nightly (Capitol)
 1968 Eddie Lockjaw Davis, Love Calls (RCA Victor)
 1968 Eddie Harris, Plug Me In (Atlantic)
 1968 Hubert Laws, Laws' Cause (Atlantic)
 1968 Jimmy McGriff, The Worm (Solid State)
 1968 Johnny Hammond Smith, Nasty! (Prestige)
 1968 Milt Jackson, Milt Jackson and the Hip String Quartet (Verve)
 1968 Nat Adderley, You, Baby (A&M/CTI),
 1968 Roy Ayers, Stoned Soul Picnic (Atlantic)
 1968 Stan Getz, What the World Needs Now: Stan Getz Plays Burt Bacharach and Hal David (Verve)
 1969 Freddie Hubbard, A Soul Experiment (Atlantic)
 1969 Hubert Laws, Crying Song (CTI)
 1969 Lena Horne & Gabor Szabo, Lena & Gabor (Skye)
 1969 Aretha Franklin, Soul '69 (Atlantic)
 1969 Pearls Before Swine, These Things Too (Reprise)
 1969 Phil Woods, Round Trip (Verve)
 1969 Ron Carter, Uptown Conversation (Embryo)
 1969 Peggy Lee, A Natural Woman (Capitol)
 1971 Dizzy Gillespie, Bobby Hackett & Mary Lou Williams, Giants (Perception),
 1971 Pearls Before Swine, Beautiful Lies You Could Live In (Reprise)
 1971 Roberta Flack, Quiet Fire (Atlantic)
 1972 Eric Kaz, If You're Lonely (Atlantic)
 1972 Grant Green, The Final Comedown (Blue Note)
 1972 Boogaloo Joe Jones, Snake Rhythm Rock (Prestige)
 1973 Bette Midler, Bette Midler (Atlantic)
 1973 Leon Spencer, Where I'm Coming From (Prestige)
 1973 Donny Hathaway, Extension of a Man (Atco)
 1973 Lou Donaldson, Sophisticated Lou (Blue Note)
 1973 Marlena Shaw, From the Depths of My Soul (Blue Note)
 1973 Paul Simon, There Goes Rhymin' Simon (Columbia)
 1973 Roberta Flack, Killing Me Softly (Atlantic)
 1973 Shirley Scott, Superstition (Cadet)
 1974 Arif Mardin, Journey (Atlantic)
 1974 Aretha Franklin, With Everything I Feel in Me (Atlantic)
 1974 Gato Barbieri, Chapter Three: Viva Emiliano Zapata (Impulse!)
 1974 Jack McDuff, The Fourth Dimension (Cadet)
 1975 Jack McDuff, Magnetic Feel (Cadet)
 1975 Hank Jones, Hanky Panky (East Wind)
 1975 Paul Simon, Still Crazy After All These Years (Columbia)
 1976 Etta Jones, Ms. Jones to You (Muse)
 1976 Phoebe Snow, Second Childhood (Columbia)
 1976 Benny Carter, Wonderland (Pablo)
 1977 Kate & Anna McGarrigle, Dancer with Bruised Knees (Warner Bros.)
 1977 Phoebe Snow, Never Letting Go (Columbia)
 1978 Clifford Jordan, The Adventurer (Muse)
 1978 New York Jazz Quartet, Blues for Sarka (Enja)
 1979 Charles Earland, Infant Eyes (Muse)
 1980 Sarah Vaughan, The Duke Ellington Songbook, Vol. 1 (Pablo Today)
 1980 Sarah Vaughan, The Duke Ellington Songbook, Vol. 2 (Pablo Today)
 1981 Charles Earland, Pleasant Afternoon (Muse)
 1981 Carly Simon, Torch (Warner Bros.)
 1981 Grover Washington Jr. Come Morning (Elektra)
 1982 Red Rodney, The 3R's (Muse)
 1982 Simon & Garfunkel, The Concert in Central Park (Warner Bros.)
 1983 Michel Legrand, After the Rain
 1983 Sadao Watanabe, Fill Up the Night
 1983 Willis Jackson, Nothing Butt... (Muse)
 1986 Mark Murphy, Living Room
 1988 Peggy Lee, Miss Peggy Lee Sings the Blues (Capitol)
 1989 Maureen McGovern, Naughty Baby
 1990 Bette Midler, Some People's Lives (Atlantic)
 1990 Dizzy Gillespie, The Winter in Lisbon (Milan)
 1990 Peter Allen, Making Every Moment Count (RCA)
 1991 Bob Thiele Collective, Louis Satchmo
 1992 John Hicks, Friends Old and New (Novus/RCA/BMG)
 1993 Andre Previn, What Headphones? (Angel)
 1993 Frank Morgan, Listen to the Dawn (Antilles, [1994])
 1993 Stanley Turrentine, If I Could (MusicMasters Jazz)
 1993 Peggy Lee, Love Held Lightly: Rare Songs by Harold Arlen 
 1994 Oscar Peterson & Itzhak Perlman, Side by Side (Telarc)
 1995 Andre Previn, Andre Previn and Friends Play 'Show Boat'  (Deutsche Grammophon)
 2003 Aaron Neville, Nature Boy (The Standards Album) (Verve Records)
 2007 Kenny Barron, The Traveler (Sunnyside)

References

External links
Grady Tate on Drummerworld.com

Grady Tate Interview NAMM Oral History Library (1995)
The Jazz Discography Project, www.jazzdisco.org
Grady Tate at AllMusic
Grady Tate at Discogs

1932 births
2017 deaths
African-American drummers
20th-century African-American male singers
American jazz drummers
American jazz singers
American baritones
American session musicians
Deaths from Alzheimer's disease
Deaths from dementia in New York (state)
Hard bop drummers
Milestone Records artists
Skye Records artists
Musicians from Durham, North Carolina
Musicians from New York City
New York Jazz Quartet members
Soul-jazz drummers
Jazz musicians from North Carolina
American male jazz musicians
The Tonight Show Band members
Jazz musicians from New York (state)
21st-century African-American people